Lamponella is a genus of Australian white tailed spiders that was first described by Norman I. Platnick in 2000.

Species
 it contains ten species:
Lamponella ainslie Platnick, 2000 (type) – Southern Australia, Tasmania
Lamponella beaury Platnick, 2000 – Australia (Queensland, New South Wales)
Lamponella brookfield Platnick, 2000 – Australia (Queensland)
Lamponella homevale Platnick, 2000 – Australia (Queensland)
Lamponella kanangra Platnick, 2000 – Australia (New South Wales)
Lamponella kimba Platnick, 2000 – Australia (Western Australia, South Australia)
Lamponella kroombit Platnick, 2000 – Australia (Queensland)
Lamponella taroom Platnick, 2000 – Australia (Queensland)
Lamponella wombat Platnick, 2000 – Australian Capital Territory
Lamponella wyandotte Platnick, 2000 – Australia (Queensland)

See also
 List of Lamponidae species

References

Araneomorphae genera
Lamponidae
Spiders of Australia